Ian Colin Graham Bell (born 31 October 1962 in Hatfield, Hertfordshire) programmed, designed and developed the computer game Elite (1984) with David Braben, which met with much acclaim.

Education
Bell attended the independent St Albans School. He studied at Jesus College, Cambridge, graduating with a degree (1st) in Mathematics in 1985, and a Cambridge Diploma in Computer Science in 1986.

Career
Worked as a Senior Software Engineer for Autodesk. Bell was a speaker at the 2009 GameCity game festival. Bell mentioned in his speech about the impact of games:You're reaching into the minds and the imaginary spaces of children, and you're to an extent shaping their characters and their life stories. I'm glad [Elite] isn't Doom because I'm glad that even though we didn't really think in these terms, I think its effect on players and on people's lives is good, both in the sense of giving them good memories but also in making people think in different ways and awakening interest.

Game development
His work on Elite (1984), included programming in machine code using assembly. The game was based on an open-ended non-linear game model, and included revolutionary 3D graphics, at the time. Prior to Elite, he developed Free Fall, a game set inside a coriolis space station with the player controlling an alien punching astronaut, described by Bell as "the first ever Beat 'em up". Free Fall, also a game for the BBC Micro, was published by Acornsoft in 1983. Bell put later Free Fall and Elite with the associated source code for free download on his website.

References

External links

The Guardian article Masters of Their Universe (2003)
Gameplay video of Free Fall (1983)

1962 births
Living people
British video game programmers
British computer programmers
Alumni of Jesus College, Cambridge
People from Hatfield, Hertfordshire
British video game designers
Video game producers